Mimee is a program which can convert geographical coordinates between various datums and formats.

Features
Supported coordinates formats are :
 Latitude and longitude in decimal degrees, degrees and decimal minutes, degrees-minutes-seconds, or grads
 Geocentric (or Cartesian) coordinates (XYZ)
 UTM
 Transverse Mercator, Oblique Mercator, and Conic.
232 datums and 36 grids are provided in Mimee.

Compatibility
The online version is cross-platform. It can be used in any navigator in Linux, Mac, Windows, and in mobile phones. The stand-alone versions runs on Linux and Palm OS.

References

External links
  Official website
  Online version

Free science software
Geodesy